Wild Boys is an EP by Deathline International, released in May 1997 by COP International.

Reception
Black Monday called Wild Boys "worthy of anyone's music library" and "for those not keen on Deathline International, the least you could do is obtain "Wild Boys" and see if that sparks your curiosity."

Track listing

Personnel
Adapted from the Wild Boys liner notes.

Deathline International
 Shawn Brice (as Spawn) – vocals, producer, executive-producer, engineering
 Christian Petke (as Count 0) – singing, producer, engineering, illustrations

Additional performers
 DJ Bent – remixer (4)
 Mike Welch – guitar

Production and design
 Erik Butler – photography
 Kim Phan – photography

Release history

References

External links 
 Wild Boys at Discogs (list of releases)

1997 EPs
Deathline International albums
COP International EPs